Phoenix Masonic Lodge No. 8 is a historic Masonic Lodge located at Fayetteville, Cumberland County, North Carolina.  It was built about 1855, and is a two-story, five bay, Greek Revival style frame building with a hip roof. It has flanked by wings added 1948–1950 and features a front porch supported by octagonal columns.

It was listed on the National Register of Historic Places in 1983.

References

Masonic buildings in North Carolina
Clubhouses on the National Register of Historic Places in North Carolina
Greek Revival architecture in North Carolina
Masonic buildings completed in 1855
Buildings and structures in Fayetteville, North Carolina
National Register of Historic Places in Cumberland County, North Carolina